Bakonybánk is a village in Komárom-Esztergom county, Hungary.

In the 19th and 20th centuries, a small Jewish community lived in the village, in 1880 61 Jews lived in the village, most of whom were murdered in the Holocaust. The community had a Jewish cemetery.

Personalities
 Donát Bánki, the co-inventor of the carburetor for the stationary engine, was born here in 1859

References

External links
 Street map (Hungarian)

Populated places in Komárom-Esztergom County
Jewish communities destroyed in the Holocaust